In bookkeeping, a bank reconciliation  is the process by which the bank account balance in an entity’s books of account is reconciled to the balance reported by the financial institution in the most recent bank statement. Any difference between the two figures needs to be examined and, if appropriate, rectified.

Bank statements are commonly routinely produced by the financial institution and used by account holders to perform their bank reconciliations. To assist in reconciliations, many financial institutions now also offer direct downloads of financial transaction information into the account holders accounting software, typically using the .csv file format.

Differences between an entity’s books of account and the bank’s records may arise, for mainly three reasons, they are as follows:
1) Difference due to timing in recording entries.
2) Transactions being recorded by the bank but not by the account holder.
3) Errors in recording entries.

Sometimes it may be easy to reconcile the difference by looking at the transactions in the bank statement since the last reconciliation and the entity's own accounting records (cash book) to see if some combination of them tally with the difference to be explained. Otherwise it may be necessary to go through and match every transaction in both sets of records since the last reconciliation, and identify which transactions remain unmatched. The necessary adjustments should then be made in the cash book, or reported to the bank if necessary, or any timing differences recorded to assist with future reconciliations.

For this reason, and to minimise the amount of work involved, it is good practice to carry out reconciliations at reasonably frequent intervals.

Bank reconciliation statement
A bank reconciliation statement is a statement prepared by the entity as part of the reconciliation process' which sets out the entries which have caused the difference between the two balances. It would, for example, list outstanding cheques (ie., issued cheques that have still not been presented at the bank for payment). 

The entries in the entity’s books to rectify the discovered discrepancies (except for the outstanding cheques) would typically be made in a subsequent date or period, not backdated. When cheques become stale (ie., out of date), they would typically be reversed, not cancelled.

References

Accounting terminology